Sandra Milena Sepúlveda Lopera (born 3 March 1988) is a Colombian footballer who plays as a goalkeeper for Liga Profesional Femenina club Independiente Medellín and the Colombia women's national team.

Club career
Sepúlveda joined her first club, Formas Íntimas, as a 10-year-old. She rose to club captain and played in the Copa Libertadores Femenina. She accepted a contract offer from the Israeli club Kiryat Gat in November 2015. In January 2018 she agreed to sign for Atlético Junior's newly formed women's team, who were entering the Colombian Women's Football League.

International career
Sepúlveda played for Colombia at the 2012 and 2016 Olympics. She was voted best goalkeeper at the 2014 Women's Copa America. She was part of Colombia's team at the 2015 World Cup.

Football Career and Transfer Statistics 
We are going to show you the list of football clubs and seasons in which Sandra Milena Sepúlveda Lopera has played. It includes the total number of appearance (caps), substitution details, goals, yellow and red cards stats.

References

External links 
 

1988 births
Living people
Women's association football goalkeepers
Colombian women's footballers
Colombia women's international footballers
2011 FIFA Women's World Cup players
2015 FIFA Women's World Cup players
Olympic footballers of Colombia
Footballers at the 2012 Summer Olympics
Footballers at the 2016 Summer Olympics
Pan American Games competitors for Colombia
Footballers at the 2015 Pan American Games
F.C. Kiryat Gat (women) players
Atlético Junior footballers
Independiente Medellín footballers
Colombian expatriate women's footballers
Colombian expatriate sportspeople in Israel
Expatriate women's footballers in Israel
Sportspeople from Antioquia Department
Pan American Games silver medalists for Colombia
Medalists at the 2015 Pan American Games
Pan American Games medalists in football
21st-century Colombian women